Limelight is the ninth studio album by Canadian blues/rock musician Colin James released on 4 October 2005 (see 2005 in music).  The song "Into the Mystic" was penned by Van Morrison.

Track listing 
 "Better Way To Heaven"
 "Watchin' The River Flow" (Bob Dylan)
 "Limelight"
 "Far Away Like A Radio" (Colin James, Craig Northey, Tom Wilson)
 "On My Way Back To You"
 "When I Write The Book" (Nick Lowe and Rockpile)
 "Misplaced Heart"
 "Speakeasy"
 "Healing Time"
 "Travelin'"
 "Shadow Of Love"
 "It Fills You Up"
 "Weeping Willow Tree"
 "Into The Mystic" (Van Morrison)

Personnel 
 Colin James - guitars, vocals
 Jim Keltner - drums
 Reggie McBride - bass
 James "Hutch" Hutchinson - bass

External links 
 Limelight 

Colin James albums
2005 albums
MapleMusic Recordings albums